HMS Blackburn has been the name of two Royal Navy vessels:
 , a  minesweeper launched 1918, sold 1922.
 , lead ship of the s, an aircraft transport launched 25 March 1944. She became a RNVR drillship in 1950, and was sold in 1968 to become RV Gardline Locater (Gardline Shipping). Broken up 1997.

References

 

Royal Navy ship names